This page details the process of qualifying for the 1963 African Cup of Nations. 10 African nations initially entered the competition.  Ghana and Ethiopia both automatically qualified as the host country and title holders respectively.  Uganda would withdraw before play began, thus leaving only 7 teams vying for the remaining four spots in the finals.

Qualified teams

The 6 qualified teams are:

Summary
The 8 nations were paired 2-by-2 and played knock-out matches home-and-away.  The 4 winners would then qualify for the finals.  Qualifying took place between 16 June 1963 and 6 October 1963.

Qualification matches

|}

Tunisia qualified by an aggregate score of 6–5.

Uganda withdrew; Egypt qualified.

Sudan qualified by an aggregate score of 6–0.

Guinea were disqualified for a rule breach (as neutral officials were not provided for the second leg); Nigeria qualified.

Notes

External links
 African Nations Cup 1963 - rsssf.com

Africa Cup of Nations qualification
Qualification